The Assailant (known as Besouro in Brazil) is a 2009 Brazilian action-drama film directed by João Daniel Tikhomiroff. The film is about Besouro Mangangá, a Brazilian Capoeirista from the early 1920s, to whom were attributed some heroic and legendary deeds.

Huan-Chiu Ku, Kill Bills choreographer, is responsible for the film's fight scenes. Its filming lasted three months in Bahia.

Plot
In 1924, almost forty years after slavery in Brazil is abolished, former black slaves are still oppressed by the rich. Resistance in the region of the Recôncavo Baiano is led by the elderly Mestre Alípio, master of a martial art, capoeira, used by the slaves to fight off abuse. Mestre Alípio's life has been threatened, so one of his best apprentices, Besouro, is appointed his bodyguard. However, Besouro spends all of his time playing capoeira in street circles, with the consequence that Alípio is killed by the police.

One day, Besouro is visited by a spiritual entity, Exu, who demands him worship. Trying to fight off the spirit, Besouro accidentally trashes a work fair, making the guards chase him. He jumps into a river, after which he meets a spiritual teacher, Dona Zulmira, who gives him a choker granting him corpo fechado, making him invulnerable to all attacks and weapons except by the tree known as ticum. With his new abilities, Besouro initiates a one-man guerrilla campaign against the plantations of Coronel Venâncio, the powerful army officer who oppresses Besouro's people.

Besouro's efforts earn him the enmity of his childhood friend Quero-Quero, a fellow capoeirista and a collaborator of Venâncio who believes Besouro is only worsening the situation of the local black people. Due to his stance, Quero-Quero's fiancee Dinorá leaves him, and instead goes with Besouro shortly after. A jealous Quero-Quero confronts Besouro in the jungle and fights him, but Besouro is victorious. To avenge this humiliation, Quero-Quero kills a man and incriminates Besouro, so the authorities will answer with greater force against him, and reveals to them that they can kill Besouro with a machete made of ticum wood.

Venâncio's men find Besouro and attack him, but they are initially defeated. However, the Coronel brandishes a ticum machete and slashes him, finally killing Besouro. He then goes to Dinorá and tries to rape her, but she defeats him with capoeira and flees to mourn her lover.

It's later revealed Dinorá was pregnant with Besouro's child, who is now a little boy learning capoeira under Besouro's friend Chico. The boy chooses his father's name as his own, and when Coronel Venâncio passes by him in the street, gives him a nasty stare, implying the boy will avenge his father some day.

Cast

Aílton Carmo as Besouro
Sérgio Laurentino as Orixá Exu
Anderson Grillo as Quero-Quero
Sérgio Pererê as Orixá Ossaim
Adriana Alves as Orixá Oxum
Jessica Barbosa as Orixá Iansã/Dinorá
Zebrinha as Orixá Ogum
Macalé dos Santos as Master Alípio
Flávio Rocha as Coronel Venâncio
Irandhir Santos as Noca de Antônia
Geisa Costa as Dona Zulmira
Miguel Lunardi
Antônio Fábio as Serafim
Nilton Júnior as Cobra Criada
Denise Correia
Servílio de Holanda as Genival
Leno Sacramento as Chico Canoa

References

External links
 

Brazilian action drama films
Brazilian biographical drama films
Brazilian sports drama films
2009 directorial debut films
Films about Brazilian slavery
Films set in the 1920s
Films shot in Bahia
2009 martial arts films
2009 films
Brazilian nonlinear narrative films
Capoeira films
Biographical action films
2009 action drama films
2009 biographical drama films
2000s Portuguese-language films